Jonathan Justin (born February 27, 1991, in Pereybèré, Rivière du Rempart) is a Mauritian-French footballer who is currently a free agent. He is featured on the Mauritian national team in the official 2010 FIFA World Cup video game.

Career

Senior career
Justin started off his professional career in 2007 with AS Auch Gascogne. He then bounced around in the lower leagues of France, playing for Rodez AF, Amiens SC, and again with AS Auch Gascogne. In January 2011, he transferred to Etoile FC of Singapore's S.League. On March 7, 2011, Justin scored his first two goals for the team in a 4-2 win over Hougang United FC. After only 5 months with the club, he was released by Etoile FC. He then signed with US Castanet in France.

International career
Justin has called up to play for Mauritius in 2009, his country of birth.

International goals
Scores and results list Mauritius' goal tally first.

Personal
Justin was born in Mauritius, but moved to France when he was 9. When he arrived in France, he still go to Rodez Af and sign professional in Amiens SC.

References

1991 births
Living people
Mauritian footballers
Mauritius international footballers
French footballers
French people of Mauritian descent
Mauritian expatriate footballers
Expatriate footballers in Singapore
Association football forwards
Étoile FC players